Cinder Road is an American rock band from Lutherville, Maryland, United States. Formerly known as Plunge, the band changed their name to Cinder Road. The band took their name from the street where they grew up. Cinder Road features frontman/vocalist/guitarist Mike Ruocco, guitarist Chris Shucosky, guitarist Pat Dement, drummer Mac Calvaresi, and bassist, Eric Jung. Calvaresi later became a teacher at Ridgely Middle School.

The band toured up and down the eastern seaboard from Canada to Key West and oversea trips to Southeast Asia playing shows for the Armed Forces Entertainment (AFE) network in Japan, Korea, Guam, as well as other remote areas such as Greenland and the Guantanamo Bay Naval Base.

After catching the attention of Union Entertainment Group, the management team behind Nickelback, Cinder Road signed with EMI. The band has worked closely with producer Marti Fredriksen (Aerosmith, Def Leppard, Ozzy Osbourne) on Superhuman, their most recent album which was released in June 2007.

In early 2007 Cinder Road began a four-month tour with Chris Daughtry. Subsequently, the band has toured with Alice Cooper, Candlebox, Sick Puppies, Hurt, Kiss, Red, and Puddle of Mudd. They spent part of July 2008 playing on Vans Warped Tour.

Cinder Road's first single, "Get In Get Out" peaked in the U.S. Mainstream Rock Tracks at number 31. The song also had a 14-week run at #1 on the Sirius Radio Octane Countdown.

Cinder Road's first single from Damage Control, "It Hurts" peaked in the Top 20 on Japanese International Radio Charts.

Line-up
 Michael A. Ruocco - Vocals/Guitar
 Anthony C. Shucosky - Guitar/Vocals
 Pat Dement - Guitar/Vocals
 Mac Calvaresi - Drums/Percussion/Vocals
 Eric Jung - Bass

Discography

as Plunge
Understand (2002)
"Understand" - 3:01
"Hope" - 3:21
"If I" - 3:03
"Through Your Eyes" - 3:27
"Better Days" - 3:41
"The Way" - 3:03

Hometown Hero (2004)
"Running Away" - 2:53 (Crown, 2004)
"Wasted on Your Love" - 3:37 (Crown, 2004)
"Hometown Hero" - 3:06 (Crown, 2004)
"Part Time Girlfriend" - 3:05 (Crown, 2004)
"Scared" - 3:35 (Crown, 2004)
"Fall Into One" - 3:24 (Crown, 2004)
"Ordinary Girl" - 2:36 (Crown, 2004)
"One More Time" - 3:13 (Crown, 2004)
"Stuck in Madison" - 2:39 (Crown, 2004)
"Understand" - 2:59 (Crown, 2004)
"Hope" - 3:03 (Crown, 2004)
"Heaven" - 3:57 (Crown, 2004)
"Stiff Competition" - 4:04 (Bonus Track)

as Plunge and Cinder Road
Stand in Our Way EP (2007)
"Everything You Are" - 3:37
"Stand in Our Way" - 4:09

as Cinder Road
Superhuman (2007)
"I'm So Sorry" - 3:12
"Bad Excuse" - 3:20
"Back Home to You" - 3:36
"Should've Known Better" - 3:39
"Get In Get Out" - 3:49
"Learning to Love" - 3:39
"Feels So Good to Me" - 3:32
"Superhuman" - 3:39
"One" - 4:17
"Drift Away" - 3:50
"Don't Be Scared" - 3:35
"Sleeping With The Enemy" * - 3:12
"Complete Me" * - 2:47
"Stand In Our Way" * - 4:08
"Everything You Are" * - 3:35
"#1 Fan" * - 3:47
 * = bonus track on Japanese edition
Damage Control (2010)
1. "The Worst Way" - 3:29
2. "Sex Addict" - 3:39
3. "Losing Ground" - 3:32
4. "It Hurts" - 3:34
5. "Save Me" - 2:58
6. "More" - 3:28
7. "Giving Up" - 3:47
8. "Breaking Me" - 3:13
9. "2 Hearts 2 Break" - 3:34
10. "Tennessee" - 3:33
11. "I Don't Wanna" - 3:42
12. "The Devil Made Me Do It" - 3:12
13. "Without You" - 4:00

References

External links
 Cinder Road Music Official Website
 Union Entertainment Group

Rock music groups from Maryland